João Paulo Ribeiro Sovinski (born 8 March 2001), known as João Paulo, is a Brazilian footballer who plays as a goalkeeper for Chapecoense.

Career
Born in Guarapuava, Paraná, João Paulo joined Chapecoense's youth setup in 2018, after representing Grêmio and Internacional. He made his first team debut on 25 February 2021, starting in a 2–0 Campeonato Catarinense away win against Concórdia.

João Paulo subsequently lost his starting spot to Keiller in late March 2021, and remained as a second-choice after the recovery of Tiepo. On 5 April of that year, he renewed his contract until the end of 2024.

João Paulo made his Série A debut on 13 June 2021, coming on as a first-half substitute for injured Tiepo in a 0–0 home draw against Ceará.

Career statistics

References

External links
Chapecoense profile 

2001 births
Living people
Sportspeople from Paraná (state)
Brazilian footballers
Association football goalkeepers
Campeonato Brasileiro Série A players
Associação Chapecoense de Futebol players